Trevor Johnson (born February 26, 1981) is a former American football defensive end. He has played professionally for the New York Jets, the New Orleans Saints and the St. Louis Rams.

Early life
Johnson was born in Gordon, Nebraska. He was a standout three-sport athlete in football, basketball and track at Lincoln Northeast High School.

College career
Johnson played college football at Nebraska. He was a four-time Academic All-Big 12 Conference selection at the University of Nebraska, where he also garnered Academic All-America honors as a senior. Johnson started 22 of 46 games (39 on defense and 10 on offense), recording 131 tackles with 7.5 sacks, 22 stops for losses, 25 quarterback pressures, three fumble recoveries, a forced fumble and four pass deflections. He made 68 tackles, 4.0 sacks, three passes defensed, two forced fumbles and one blocked punt as a senior. He started nine games between right defensive end and left defensive end as a junior and finished season with 54 tackles and 3.5 sacks. He switched to rush end from tight end as a sophomore and played in all 12 games. He played in 10 games as a backup tight end during freshman year.

Professional career

Pre-draft
Johnson (6-4⅜, 259) had a complete workout at combine, but he did everything again at the Pro Day. He ran 4.69 in the 40-yard dash. He had a 38½-inch vertical jump, clocked 4.14 seconds in the short shuttle and 6.88 in the three-cone drill.

New York Jets
Johnson was drafted by the New York Jets in the seventh round of the 2004 NFL Draft. He played in all sixteen regular season games and two playoff contests in rookie season for New York Jets, and registered fifteen tackles (eight solo). He played in nine games and saw action on special teams and defense and totaled ten tackles. He was inactive for the first three games of the 2006 season with New York before being waived on September 26, 2006.

New Orleans
Johnson was signed as free agent by the New Orleans Saints on November 29, 2006, and was inactive for one game. He played in the season finale against the Carolina Panthers on December 31, 2006, and totaled four tackles.

St. Louis Rams
Johnson joined the St. Louis Rams on February 5, 2007, on a waiver claim from the New Orleans Saints.

Kansas City Chiefs
Was signed and then released. Johnson is currently a free agent.

See also
 Waivers (American football)
 National Football League Draft

References

External links
Po-Football-Reference.com
databaseFootball.com
NFL Enterprises LLC

1981 births
Living people
People from Gordon, Nebraska
American football defensive ends
Nebraska Cornhuskers football players
New York Jets players
New Orleans Saints players
St. Louis Rams players
Kansas City Chiefs players
Lincoln Northeast High School alumni